Carlos María "Rhod" Rothfuss (1920 – December 31, 1969) was a Uruguayan-Argentine artist who specialized in painting and sculpture. He was considered a key theoretician for the development of the concrete art movement in Argentina in the 1940s and was a founding member of the international Latin American abstract art movement, Grupo Madí.

Early life and education 
Rothfuss was born in Montevideo, Uruguay.

In 1938, Rothfuss studied art at Círculo de Bellas Artes in Montevideo. He studied with the artists Guillermo Laborde and José Cúneo. In the early 1940s, he studied at the Academia de Bellas Artes in Montevideo.

Career 
In 1939 while at an Emilio Pettoruti art show, Rothfuss met and became friends with the artist, Carmelo Arden Quin.

In 1942, Rothfuss moved from Uruguay to Buenos Aires, Argentina, where he lived until 1945.

Rothfuss soon became friends with fellow artists, Gyula Kosice, Tomás Maldonado, Carmelo Arden Quin.

In 1944, Rothfuss was part of the group of artists who created and edited the magazine called Arturo, which existed for only one issue, and included fellow artists, Carmelo Arden Quin, Edgar Bailey, Gyula Kosice, Raúl Lozza, Tomas Maldonado, and Lidy Prati. Rothfuss contributed an article called: "El marco. un problema de la plástica actual (The frame: A Problem of Plastic Arts Today)," which became an important text on the theory and movement of art towards geometry. Rothfuss was stating what was then a revolutionary idea, that he was advocation for the removal of the frame of the painting, saying that it got in the way of the art.

In 1945, Rothfuss participated in two seminal concrete art exhibitions called Arte Concreto-Invención in Buenos Aires.

In 1945, Rothfuss participated in Asociación Arte Concreto-Invención's first two concrete art exhibitions organized at the homes of Swiss born psychoanalyst, Enrique Pichon-Rivière, and  German-Argentinian photographer, Grete Stern. Rothfuss also participated in the group's third exhibition organized in October 1946 at the Argentinian Society of Plastic Arts.

During this time, to illustrate the concrete nature of his work, Rothfuss used nontraditional materials like diamonds and employed notched and irregular shapes in his artwork.

From 1945 to 1950, Rothfuss created sculptures that had moving parts.

In 1946, Rothfuss joined the Asociación Arte Concreto-Invención, a concrete art group founded by Tomás Maldonado in 1944. Other artists in the group included Alfredo Hlito, Lidy Prati, Manuel Espinosa, Enio Iommi, Raul Lozza among others.

In 1946, Gyula Kosice, Carmelo Arden Quin, and Rothfuss founded the Grupo Madí.

Selected exhibitions 
Group exhibitions
 1945: "Arte Concreto-Invención." Buenos Aires – two exhibitions
 1976: "Homenaje a la vanguardia argentina: Dècada del 40." Galeria Arte Nuevo (Buenos Aires)
 1980: "Vanguardias de la década del 40. Arte Concreto-Invención, Arte Madí, Perceptismo." Museo de Artes Plásticas Eduardo Sívori (Buenos Aires)
 1992–93: "Artistas latinoamericanos del siglo XX." Estación Plaza de Armas (Seville); Musée national d’art moderne, Centre national d’art et de culture Georges Pompidou (Paris); Josef-Haubrich-Kunsthalle, Cologne; The Museum of Modern Art (New York)
 1994–95: "Art from Argentina 1920–1994." Museum of Modern Art (Oxford) [traveling exhibition]
 1997–98: "Arte Madí." Museo Nacional Centro de Arte Reina Sofía (Madrid); Museo Extremeño e Iberoamericano de Arte Contemporáneo (Badajoz) – Exhibition held at the Museo Nacional Centro de Arte Reina Sofia, July 1-October 27, 1997, and at the Museo Extremeño Iberoamericano de Arte Contemporaneo, November 7, 1997 – January 11, 1998
 2000: "Heterotopías. Medio siglo sin lugar. 1918–1968." Museo Nacional Centro de Arte Reina Sofía (Madrid)
 2001: "Abstract Art from Río de la Plata. Buenos Aires and Montevideo, 1933–1953." The Americas Society (New York)
 2002: "Madí. L’art sud-américain." Musée de Grenoble (Grenoble)
 2003–4: "Arte abstracto argentino, Galleria d’arte moderna e contemporanea." Bergamo; Fundación Proa (Buenos Aires)
 2004: "Inverted Utopias. Avant-Garde Art in Latin America." Museum of Fine Arts, (Houston Texas)
 2007: "The Geometry of Hope. Latin American Abstract Art from the Patricia Phelps de Cisneros Collection." Blanton Museum of Art, The University of Texas at Austin (Austin, Texas); Grey Art Gallery, New York University (New York)

Selected works 
 Composición Madí at Museum of Fine Arts, Houston (1946)
 Pintura Madí o persistencia de un contorno Madí at Fundación Proa (1946)
 Composición Madí at Museum of Fine Arts, Houston (1948)
  (1955)

Works and publications 
 
 
 
 
 
  – Catalog of an exhibition held at the Museo Nacional Centro de Arte Reina Sofia, July 1-October 27, 1997, and at the Museo Extreme~no e Iberoamericano de Arte Contemporaneo, November 7, 1997 – January 11, 1998
   – Exhibition catalog of Cold America, Geometric Abstraction in Latin America (1934–1973), Fundación Juan March, Madrid, February 11-May 15, 2011
   – Folleto de la expoción celebrada América fría. La abstracción geométrica en Latinoamerica (1934–1973) en la Fundación Juan March en Madrid del 11 de febrero al 15 de mayo de 2011
 "Regarding the Frame" (1950) by Rhod Rothfuss p. 432

See also 
 Concrete art
 Grupo Madí

References

Further reading 
   – Exhibition at the Fogg Art Museum, Cambridge, MA, 3 March-4 November 2001
  – exhibition organized by the Americas Society and presented from September 11-December 9, 2001
   – Exhibition catalog of Cold America, Geometric Abstraction in Latin America (1934–1973), Fundación Juan March, Madrid, February 11-May 15, 2011
   – Folleto de la expoción celebrada América fría. La abstracción geométrica en Latinoamerica (1934–1973) en la Fundación Juan March en Madrid del 11 de febrero al 15 de mayo de 2011

External links 
 
 Rhod Rothfuss (artist file) at the Museum of Modern Art
 Rhod Rothfuss at the Museum of Geometric and MADI Art
 Rhod Rothfuss at the Enciclopédia Itaú Cultural

1920 births
1969 deaths
Concrete art
Uruguayan painters
Argentine painters
Argentine male painters
Argentine sculptors
Uruguayan sculptors
Uruguayan emigrants to Argentina